Saul Moyal (شاوؤل مويال) was an Egyptian Olympic fencer. 

He competed in the individual foil (where he made it to the semi-finals), individual épée (where he came in 10th), the team foil event (where the team was eliminated in the first round), and the team épée event (where the team made it to the quarterfinals) at the 1928 Summer Olympics. 

Moyal was Jewish, and at the 1932 Maccabiah Games in Israel, he won gold medals in all three weapons. He was runner-up in the Egyptian foil championship in 1928, and took third place in 1936.

References

External links
 

Year of birth missing
Possibly living people
Competitors at the 1932 Maccabiah Games
Egyptian male épée fencers
Egyptian male foil fencers
Egyptian male sabre fencers
Olympic fencers of Egypt
Fencers at the 1928 Summer Olympics
Jewish male épée fencers
Jewish male foil fencers
Jewish male sabre fencers
Egyptian Jews
Maccabiah Games gold medalists
Maccabiah Games medalists in fencing
Maccabiah Games competitors
20th-century Egyptian people